{{Infobox station
| name          = Novosibirsk-Glavny
| native_name   = Новосибирск-Главный
| native_name_lang = ru
| style         = RZD
| image         = Novosibirsk Glavny Station 07-2016 img1.jpg
| image_caption = View of the station from the street.
| address       = Zheleznodorozhny District, Novosibirsk
| coordinates   = 
| line          = 
| other         = 
| structure     = At-grade
| platform      = 8 (7 island platforms)
| depth         = 
| levels        = 
| tracks        = 14
| parking       = Yes
| bicycle       = 
| opened        = 1893
| closed        = 
| rebuilt       = 
| electrified   =  overhead line
| ADA           = 
| code          = 87390
| owned         = Russian Railways
| operator      = West Siberian Railway
| train_operators = 
| zone          = 0
| former        = ''Ob (before 1909) Novonikolaevsk (1909-1926)
| passengers    = 
| pass_year     = 
| pass_percent  = 
| pass_system   = 
| mpassengers   = 
| services      = 
| map_locator   = 
| route_map     = 
| map_state     = collapsed
}}Novosibirsk-Glavny''' is the primary passenger railway station for the city of Novosibirsk in Russia, and an important stop along the Trans-Siberian Railway and Turkestan–Siberia Railway.  The station is one of the largest in Russia.  The main building takes an area of 30,000 square metres.

Trains and destinations

International

References

Railway stations in Novosibirsk
Trans-Siberian Railway
Railway stations in the Russian Empire opened in 1894
Zheleznodorozhny City District, Novosibirsk
1894 establishments in the Russian Empire
Cultural heritage monuments of regional significance in Novosibirsk Oblast